A digital movie camera for digital cinematography is a video camera that captures footage digitally rather than the historically used movie camera, which shoots on film stock. Different digital movie cameras output a variety of different acquisition formats. Cameras designed for domestic use have also been used for some low-budget independent productions.

Since the 2010s, digital movie cameras have become the dominant type of camera in the motion picture industry.

Types

Professional cameras 
There are a number of video cameras on the market designed specifically for high-end digital cinematography use. These cameras typically offer relatively large sensors, selectable frame rates, recording options with low compression ratios or in some cases with no compression, and the ability to use high-quality optics. Some of the cameras are expensive and some are only available to rent.

Some of the most used professional digital movie cameras include:
 Arri Alexa
 Blackmagic URSA
 Blackmagic Pocket Cinema Cameras
 Canon Cinema EOS
 Panavision Genesis
 Panasonic VariCam
 Red Epic
 Red Scarlet
 Red One
 Sony CineAlta

Prosumer and consumer cameras 
Independent movie-makers have also pressed low-cost consumer and hybrid prosumer cameras into service for digital cinematography. Though image quality is typically much lower than what can be produced with professional digital cinematography cameras, the technology has steadily improved, most significantly in the last several years with the arrival of high-definition cameras in this market. These inexpensive cameras are limited by their relatively high compression ratios, their small sensors, and the quality of their optics. Many also have integrated lenses which cannot be changed.

Resolution

Standard definition 
MiniDV was the predominant standard definition consumer video acquisition format in the early 2000s. Steven Soderbergh used the popular Canon XL2 MiniDV camera while shooting Full Frontal. The Danny Boyle directed British horror film, 28 Days Later was also shot on MiniDV using the Canon XL1S, albeit with traditional Panavision 35mm film lenses. One of the first MiniDV cameras used on a feature film was the Sony VX-1000, which was used to shoot Spike Lee's Bamboozled.

In 2002, Panasonic released the AG-DVX100, which was the first affordable camcorder to support progressive scan at 24 frames per second, duplicating the motion characteristics of film and allowing for easier transfers to film. This feature made the camera extremely popular with low-budget movie-makers.

High definition 
Sony, JVC, Canon and other vendors have brought high-definition video acquisition to the consumer and prosumer markets with the HDV format. HDV cameras are sold with a wide range of capabilities. Many support progressive shooting modes, and some have sensors with full 1920x1080 resolution (though the HDV format itself can only record 1440x1080 in non-square pixels, and DVCPRO HD only records at 1280x1080 or 960x720). In addition, some Canon and JVC HDV camcorders have the ability to use high-quality interchangeable lenses, rather than the fixed lenses that are included with most prosumer cameras.

The Canon EOS 5D Mark II is a "full-frame" format HDSLR camera capable of recording 1080p video in at 24, 25 or 30 frames per second, with a file size limit of 4 GB. Movie makers are pressing this camera into service as a low-cost way to shoot motion footage. The Canon EOS 7D is an APS-C HDSLR was used to shoot the independent horror film Marianne  and Sound of My Voice. 
Both cameras have been used together to shoot point-of-view (POV) action scenes in The Avengers due to the cameras being relatively cheap and small and therefore easily used to shoot different angles in tight locations.

List of digital movie cameras

See also
 Digital cinematography
 Digital cinema
 List of films shot in digital

References

Film and video technology
Digital movie cameras